Chrysalis  (English version) / Désirs contraires (French version) is the second international studio album by Anggun. The album was released by Columbia Records and Sony Music Entertainment in over 15 countries in Europe and Asia, with the English version being first released in Japan on 30 August 2000 and the French version premiering in France on 2 October 2000. A major departure to her debut album's world music composition, Chrysalis features electropop sounds with elements of R&B and ambient music. The album was again produced by Erick Benzi, but it featured some of Anggun's compositions. Anggun also co-wrote the entire material on the English version.

Chrysalis debuted at number 66 on the Billboards European Top 100 Albums chart. It became her second top-ten album in Italy, and was certified gold in a week after its release. In Indonesia, Chrysalis received quadruple Platinum certification. Désirs contraires peaked at number 48 on the French Albums Chart and has sold about 30,000 copies in France. The album received Platinum Export for its commercial success outside France. Singles released were "Still Reminds Me" and "Chrysalis" from Chrysalis, as well as "Un geste d'amour" and "Derrière la porte" from Désirs contraires. To promote the album, Anggun embarked on a tour across Asia and Europe, including her first ever concert in France at Le Bataclan on 1 February 2001.

Composition
As the title suggests, Chrysalis shows Anggun's growth—both personally and musically—as prior to the release of the album, she divorced her husband of seven years, Michel Georgea. The divorce presumably inspired Anggun to write songs like "Still Reminds Me" and "Broken Dream," among others, on the album. The album also marked Anggun's artistic development, as a departure from Snow on the Sahara where she only co-wrote one song, on Chrysalis she co-wrote every song with Erick Benzi with exceptions of "Rain," "Tears of Sorrow," and "Non Angelical," (co-written with Cathy Grier and Erick Benzi) and "Comme un privilege" (co-written with Erick Benzi and Nicolas Mingot). Anggun's songwriting varies from heartbroken ("Still Reminds Me," "Broken Dream"), love-longing ("Breathing," "Signs of Destiny"), humanity ("Tears of Sorrow," "How the World...") even spirituality ("A Prayer") and a fan's obsession ("Want You to Want Me").

The music is also a departure from the highly ethnic-influenced Snow on the Sahara to more Euro-pop/electro sounds. This evident is clear on songs like "Rain" ("Les champs de peine"), "Signs of Destiny" ("Tout peut arriver") and "Forbidden Love." Meanwhile, her pop/world trademark can also be found on "How The World..." ("Une femme"). The album also features some acoustic ballads (accompanied with piano only), in songs like "Want You to Want Me" ("Tu nages") and "Broken Dream". "Tu nages" was later covered by Celine Dion for her French album 1 fille & 4 types (2003).

Another thing, the album has a lot simpler production compared to Snow on the Sahara, as the sounds are mainly based on synth and computer programming. Only two instruments were used: electric guitar and keyboards. Like her debut album, the music on the English version is the same as the French one, but this time around, the lyrics are different (on Chrysalis, Anggun wrote all the lyrics by herself except for four songs and on Désirs Contraires, Erick Benzi took a sole songwriting part). There are two songs in the French version which are not available on the English version ("Marcher sur la mer" and "Brume"). Instead, they are replaced with two original songs in English ("A Prayer" and "Forbidden Love").

Reception
Chrysalis debuted at number 66 on the European Top 100 Albums chart compiled by Music & Media and Billboard based on sales all over the continent. It became Anggun's second top-ten album on the official albums chart by Federazione Industria Musicale Italiana (FIMI) and was certified gold in Italy in just one week of release. It also became Anggun's best-selling international album in Indonesia to date, with four Platinum certification. Critically, the album received positive response from music critics. Brittany Jerlinga in a review for Pulse! magazine called the album "brilliant" and wrote that its songs are "soulful, strong and heart-felt."

Track listing

English version

French version

Singles
Chrysalis
"Still Reminds Me"
"Chrysalis"
"Yang 'Ku Tunggu"
"Tears of Sorrow"

Désirs contraires
 "Un geste d'amour"
 "Derrière la porte"
 "Tu mens"

Charts

Weekly Charts

Certifications

Release history

References

External links
Anggun official website

2000 albums
Anggun albums
Albums produced by Erick Benzi
French-language albums